Burford is a civil parish in Shropshire, England.  It contains 13 listed buildings that are recorded in the National Heritage List for England.  Of these, one is listed at Grade I, the highest of the three grades, two are at Grade II*, the middle grade, and the others are at Grade II, the lowest grade.  The parish contains the village of Burford and the surrounding countryside.  Some of the listed buildings are grouped around Burford House and its neighbouring St Mary's Church to the southwest of the village.  Otherwise, in and around the village, the listed buildings include a bridge over the River Teme, a hotel, a hospital, a cottage, a former toll house, and two mileposts.


Key

Buildings

References

Citations

Sources

Lists of buildings and structures in Shropshire